Lantan may refer to:
 Lantan Lake, meaning Orchid Lake or formerly called Hong-Mao Pei, is located in eastern Chiayi City, Taiwan
 Lantan (Forgotten Realms), a grouping of islands in the fictional Island Kingdoms of Faerûn
 Lantan, Cher, a commune of the Cher département in France
 Lantan, a hill tribe that live in Louang Namtha province, northwestern Laos and Yunnan province, China